Wimpy's Diner is a Canadian chain of 51 restaurants in southern Ontario based on the 1950s- and 1960s-themed diners serving hamburgers, but also serving breakfast all day along with various lunches and dinners and specialty poutines.  Wimpy's was established in 1961 as "Wimpy's Drive-In" in Toronto (Wimpy's Charcoal House at Finch Avenue West and Yonge Street).  In 1988, it was turned into a full-service restaurant.  A second location was opened in 1992. Locations are now found in Southern Ontario.

See also
List of Canadian restaurant chains

References

Restaurants established in 1961
Restaurant chains in Canada
1961 establishments in Ontario
Canadian companies established in 1961